This is a list of Texas butterflies, all species of butterfly found in the state of Texas.

Family Papilionidae (swallowtails)

Subfamily Papilioninae (swallowtails)
Battus philenor (pipevine swallowtail)
Battus polydamas (Polydamas swallowtail)
Eurytides marcellus (zebra swallowtail)
Eurytides philolaus (dark kite-swallowtail)
Papilio polyxenes (black swallowtail)
Papilio thoas (Thoas swallowtail)
Papilio cresphontes (giant swallowtail)
Papilio ornythion (ornythion swallowtail)
Papilio astyalus (broad-banded swallowtail)
Papilio glaucus (eastern tiger swallowtail)
Papilio rutulus (western tiger swallowtail)
Papilio multicaudata (two-tailed swallowtail)
Papilio pilumnus (three-tailed swallowtail)
Papilio troilus (spicebush swallowtail)
Papilio garamus (magnificent swallowtail)
Papilio palamedes (Palamedes swallowtail)
Papilio victorinus (Victorine swallowtail)
Papilio pharnaces (pink-spotted swallowtail)
Papilio anchisiades (ruby-spotted swallowtail)
Parides eurimedes (mylotes cattle heart)

Family Pieridae (whites and sulphurs)

Subfamily Pierinae (whites)
Anthocharis cethura (desert orangetip)
Anthocharis midea (falcate orangetip)
Anthocharis thoosa (southwestern orangetip)
Appias drusilla (Florida white)
Ascia monuste (great southern white)
Catasticta nimbice (Mexican dartwhite)
Euchloe lotta (desert marble)
Euchloe olympia (Olympia marble)
Ganyra josephina (giant white)
Leptophobia aripa (mountain white)
Pieris rapae (cabbage white)
Pontia protodice (checkered white)
Pontia sisymbrii (spring white)

Subfamily Coliadinae (sulphurs)
Anteos clorinde (white angled-sulphur)
Anteos maerula (yellow angled-sulphur)
Aphrissa statira (Statira sulphur)
Colias eurytheme (orange sulphur)
Colias philodice (clouded sulphur)
Eurema albula (ghost yellow)
Eurema boisduvaliana (Boisduval's yellow)
Eurema daira (barred yellow)
Eurema dina (dina yellow)
Eurema lisa (little yellow)
Eurema mexicana (Mexican yellow)
Eurema nicippe (sleepy orange)
Eurema nise (mimosa yellow)
Eurema proterpia (tailed orange)
Eurema salome (Salome yellow)
Kricogonia lyside (lyside sulphur)
Nathalis iole (dainty sulphur)
Phoebis agarithe (large orange sulphur)
Phoebis argante (apricot sulphur)
Phoebis neocypris (tailed sulphur)
Phoebis philea (orange-barred sulphur)
Phoebis sennae (cloudless sulphur)
Zerene cesonia (southern dogface)

Subfamily Dismorphiinae (mimic-whites)
Enantia albania (costa-spotted mimic-white)

Family Lycaenidae (gossamer-wing butterflies)

Subfamily Miletinae (harvesters)
Feniseca tarquinius (harvester)

Subfamily Lycaeninae (coppers)
Lycaena dione (gray copper)

Subfamily Theclinae (hairstreaks)
Allosmaitia strophius (Strophius hairstreak)
Atlides halesus (great purple hairstreak)
Callophrys gryneus (juniper hairstreak)
Callophrys henrici (Henry's elfin)
Callophrys irus (frosted elfin)
Callophrys mcfarlandi (sandia hairstreak)
Callophrys niphon (eastern pine elfin)
Callophrys spinetorum (thicket hairstreak)
Callophrys xami (xami hairstreak)
Calycopis cecrops (red-banded hairstreak)
Calycopis isobeon (dusky-blue groundstreak)
Chlorostrymon simaethis (silver-banded hairstreak)
Chlorostrymon telea (Telea hairstreak)
Cyanophrys goodsoni (Goodson's greenstreak)
Cyanophrys herodotus (tropical greenstreak)
Cyanophrys miserabilis (Clench's greenstreak)
Electrostrymon canus (muted hairstreak)
Electrostrymon sangala (ruddy hairstreak)
Erora quaderna (Arizona hairstreak)
Eumaeus toxea (Mexican cycadian)
Fixsenia favonius (southern hairstreak)
Fixsenia polingi (Poling's hairstreak)
Hypaurotis crysalus (Colorado hairstreak)
Ministrymon azia (gray ministreak)
Ministrymon clytie (Clytie ministreak)
Ministrymon echion (red-spotted hairstreak)
Ministrymon janevicroy (Vicroy’s ministreak)
Ministrymon leda (Leda ministreak)
Ocaria ocrisia (black hairstreak)
Oenomaus ortygnus (aquamarine hairstreak)
Parrhasius m-album (white m hairstreak)
Phaeostrymon alcestis (soapberry hairstreak)
Rekoa marius (Marius hairstreak)
Rekoa palegon (gold-bordered hairstreak)
Rekoa zebina (zebina hairstreak)
Satyrium behrii (Behr's hairstreak)
Satyrium calanus (banded hairstreak)
Satyrium edwardsii (Edwards' hairstreak)
Satyrium kingi (King's hairstreak)
Satyrium liparops (striped hairstreak)
Satyrium titus (coral hairstreak)
Siderus tephraeus (pearly-gray hairstreak)
Strymon albata (white scrub-hairstreak)
Strymon alea (Lacey's scrub-hairstreak)
Strymon bazochii (lantana scrub-hairstreak)
Strymon bebrycia (red-lined scrub-hairstreak)
Strymon cestri (tailless scrub-hairstreak)
Strymon istapa (mallow scrub-hairstreak)
Strymon melinus (gray hairstreak)
Strymon rufofusca (red-crescent scrub-hairstreak)
Strymon serapio (bromeliad scrub-hairstreak)
Strymon yojoa (Yojoa scrub-hairstreak)

Subfamily Polyommatinae (blues)
Brephidium exile (western pygmy-blue)
Brephidium isophthalma (eastern pygmy-blue)
Celastrina ladon (spring azure)
Celastrina neglecta (summer azure)
Cupido comyntas (eastern tailed-blue)
Echinargus isola (Reakirt's blue)
Euphilotes rita (rita dotted-blue)
Glaucopsyche lygdamus (silvery blue)
Hemiargus ceraunus (Ceraunus blue)
Icaricia lupini (lupine blue)
Leptotes cassius (Cassius blue)
Leptotes marina (marine blue)
Plebejus melissa (Melissa blue)
Zizula cyna (cyna blue)

Family Riodinidae (metalmarks)
Apodemia chisosensis (Chisos metalmark)
Apodemia duryi (Mexican metalmark)
Apodemia hepburni (Hepburn's metalmark)
Apodemia multiplaga (narrow-winged metalmark)
Apodemia palmeri (Palmer's metalmark)
Apodemia phyciodoides (crescent metalmark)
Apodemia walkeri (Walker's metalmark)
Calephelis nemesis (fatal metalmark)
Calephelis nilus (rounded metalmark)
Calephelis rawsoni (Rawson's metalmark)
Calephelis virginiensis (little metalmark)
Caria ino (red-bordered metalmark)
Emesis emesia (curve-winged metalmark)
Emesis tenedia (falcate metalmark)
Emesis zela (Zela metalmark)
Lasaia sula (blue metalmark)
Melanis pixe (red-bordered pixie)

Family Nymphalidae (brush-footed butterflies)

Subfamily Libytheinae (snouts)
Libytheana carinenta (American snout)

Subfamily Heliconiinae (heliconians and fritillaries)
Agraulis vanillae (Gulf fritillary)
Dione moneta (Mexican silverspot)
Dryadula phaetusa (banded orange heliconian)
Dryas julia (Julia heliconian)
Eueides isabella (Isabella's heliconian)
Euptoieta claudia (variegated fritillary)
Euptoieta hegesia (Mexican fritillary)
Heliconius charithonia (zebra heliconian)
Heliconius erato (Erato heliconian)
Philaethria dido (scarce bamboo page)

Speyeria cybele (great spangled fritillary)

Subfamily Nymphalinae (true brush-foots)
Anartia fatima (banded peacock)
Anartia jatrophae (white peacock)
Chlosyne acastus (sagebrush checkerspot)
Chlosyne definita (definite patch)
Chlosyne endeis (banded patch)
Chlosyne gorgone (gorgone checkerspot)
Chlosyne janais (crimson patch)
Chlosyne lacinia (bordered patch)
Chlosyne marina (red-spotted patch)
Chlosyne nycteis (silvery checkerspot)
Chlosyne rosita (rosita patch)
Dymasia dymas (tiny checkerspot)
Euphydryas chalcedona (variable checkerspot)
Euphydryas phaeton (Baltimore)
Hypolimnas misippus (mimic)
Junonia coenia (common buckeye)
Junonia genoveva (tropical buckeye)
Microtia elva (elf)
Nymphalis antiopa (mourning cloak)
Phyciodes argentea (chestnut crescent)
Phyciodes graphica (graphic crescent)
Phyciodes mylitta (Mylitta crescent)
Phyciodes phaon (Phaon crescent)
Phyciodes picta (painted crescent)
Phyciodes ptolyca (black crescent)
Phyciodes texana (Texan crescent)
Phyciodes tharos (pearl crescent)
Phyciodes tulcis (Tulcis crescent)
Poladryas minuta (dotted checkerspot)
Polygonia comma (eastern comma)
Polygonia interrogationis (question mark)
Siproeta epaphus (rusty-tipped page)
Siproeta stelenes (malachite)
Texola elada (Elada checkerspot)
Thessalia fulvia (Fulvia checkerspot)
Thessalia theona (Theona checkerspot)
Vanessa annabella (West Coast lady)
Vanessa atalanta (red admiral)
Vanessa cardui (painted lady)
Vanessa virginiensis (American lady)

Subfamily Limenitidinae (admirals and relatives)
Adelpha basiloides (spot-celled sister)
Adelpha bredowii (California sister)
Adelpha fessonia (band-celled sister)
Biblis hyperia (red rim)
Diaethria anna (Anna's eighty-eight)
Diaethria asteria (Mexican eighty-eight)
Dynamine dyonis (blue-eyed sailor)
Dynamine tithia (Tithian sailor)
Epiphile adrasta (common banner)
Eunica monima (dingy purplewing)
Eunica tatila (Florida purplewing)
Hamadryas amphinome (red cracker)
Hamadryas februa (gray cracker)
Hamadryas feronia (variable cracker)
Hamadryas fornax
Hamadryas guatemalena (Guatemalan cracker)
Hamadryas iphthime (brownish cracker)
Historis acheronta (tailed cecropian)
Historis odius (Orion)
Limenitis archippus (viceroy)
Limenitis arthemis astyanax ('Astyanax' red-spotted purple)
Limenitis arthemis (red-spotted purple)
Limenitis weidemeyerii (Weidemeyer's admiral)
Marpesia chiron (many-banded daggerwing)
Marpesia coresia (waiter daggerwing)
Marpesia petreus (ruddy daggerwing)
Mestra amymone (common mestra)
Myscelia cyananthe (blackened bluewing)
Myscelia ethusa (Mexican bluewing)
Smyrna blomfildia (Blomfild's beauty)
Smyrna karwinskii (Karwinski's beauty)

Subfamily Charaxinae (leafwings)
Anaea andria (goatweed leafwing)
Anaea echemus (chestnut leafwing)
Anaea glycerium (angled leafwing)
Anaea pithyusa (pale-spotted leafwing)
Anaea troglodyta (tropical leafwing)

Subfamily Apaturinae (emperors)
Asterocampa celtis (hackberry emperor)
Asterocampa clyton (tawny emperor)
Asterocampa leilia (empress leilia)
Doxocopa laure (silver emperor)
Doxocopa pavon (Pavon emperor)

Subfamily Satyrinae (satyrs)
Cercyonis meadii (Mead's wood nymph)
Cercyonis pegala (common wood nymph)
Cyllopsis gemma (gemmed satyr)
Cyllopsis pertepida (canyonland satyr)
Enodia anthedon (northern pearly eye)
Enodia creola (Creole pearly eye)
Enodia portlandia (southern pearly eye)
Gyrocheilus patrobas (red-bordered satyr)
Hermeuptychia sosybius (Carolina satyr)
Megisto cymela (little wood satyr)
Megisto rubricata (red satyr)
Megisto viola (Viola's wood satyr)
Neonympha areolata (Georgia satyr)

Subfamily Danainae (monarchs)
Danaus eresimus (soldier)
Danaus gilippus (queen)
Danaus plexippus (monarch)
Dircenna klugii (Klug's clearwing)
Lycorea cleobaea (tiger mimic-queen)

Family Hesperiidae (skippers)

Subfamily Pyrrhopyginae (firetips)
Pyrrhopyge araxes (dull firetip)

Subfamily Pyrginae (spread-wing skippers)
Achalarus albociliatus (Skinner's cloudywing)
Achalarus casica (desert cloudywing)
Achalarus jalapus (jalapus cloudywing)
Achalarus lyciades (hoary edge)
Achalarus toxeus (coyote cloudywing)
Achlyodes pallida
Aguna asander (gold-spotted aguna)
Aguna claxon (emerald aguna)
Aguna metophis (tailed aguna)
Arteurotia tractipennis (starred skipper)
Astraptes alardus (frosted flasher)
Astraptes alector (Gilbert's flasher)
Astraptes anaphus (yellow-tipped flasher)
Astraptes egregius (small-spotted flasher)
Astraptes fulgerator (two-barred flasher)
Autochton cellus (golden banded-skipper)
Autochton cincta (Chisos banded-skipper)
Autochton pseudocellus (Sonoran banded-skipper)
Bolla brennus (obscure bolla)
Bolla clytius (mottled bolla)
Cabares potrillo (potrillo skipper)
Carrhenes canescens (hoary skipper)
Celaenorrhinus fritzgaertneri (Fritzgaertner's flat)
Celaenorrhinus stallingsi (Stallings' flat)
Celotes limpia (scarce streaky-skipper)
Celotes nessus (common streaky-skipper)
Chioides catillus (white-striped longtail)
Chioides zilpa (Zilpa longtail)
Chiomara georgina (white-patched skipper)
Codatractus alcaeus (white-crescent longtail)
Codatractus arizonensis (Arizona skipper)
Cogia calchas (mimosa skipper)
Cogia hippalus (acacia skipper)
Cogia outis (Outis skipper)
Eantis tamenund (sickle-winged skipper)
Epargyreus clarus (silver-spotted skipper)
Epargyreus exadeus (broken silverdrop)
Erynnis baptisiae (wild indigo duskywing)
Erynnis brizo (sleepy duskywing)
Erynnis funeralis (funereal duskywing)
Erynnis horatius (Horace's duskywing)
Erynnis juvenalis (Juvenal's duskywing)
Erynnis martialis (mottled duskywing)
Erynnis meridianus (meridian duskywing)
Erynnis scudderi (Scudder's duskywing)
Erynnis telemachus (Rocky Mountain duskywing)
Erynnis tristis (mournful duskywing)
Erynnis zarucco (zarucco duskywing)
Gesta invisa (false duskywing)
Gorgythion begga (variegated skipper)
Grais stigmatica (hermit skipper)
Heliopetes arsalte (veined white-skipper)
Heliopetes laviana (Laviana white-skipper)
Heliopetes macaira (Turk's-cap white-skipper)
Heliopyrgus domicella (Erichson's white-skipper)
Hesperopsis alpheus (saltbush sootywing)
Nisoniades rubescens (purplish-black skipper)
Noctuana stator (red-studded skipper)
Pellicia arina (glazed pellicia)
Pellicia dimidiata (morning glory pellicia)
Phocides belus
Phocides palemon (guava skipper)
Pholisora catullus (common sootywing)
Pholisora mejicana (Mexican sootywing)
Polygonus leo (hammock skipper)
Polygonus manueli (Manuel's skipper)
Polythrix mexicanus (Mexican longtail)
Polythrix octomaculata (eight-spotted longtail)
Proteides mercurius (mercurial skipper)
Pyrgus albescens (white checkered skipper)
Pyrgus communis (common checkered-skipper)
Pyrgus oileus (tropical checkered skipper)
Pyrgus philetas (desert checkered skipper)
Pyrgus scriptura (small checkered-skipper)
Sostrata nordica (blue-studded skipper)
Spathilepia clonius (falcate skipper)
Staphylus azteca (Aztec scallopwing)
Staphylus ceos (golden-headed scallopwing)
Staphylus hayhurstii (Hayhurst's scallopwing)
Staphylus mazans (Mazans scallopwing)
Systasea pulverulenta (Texas powdered skipper)
Systasea zampa (Arizona powdered skipper)
Thorybes bathyllus (southern cloudywing)
Thorybes confusis (confusing cloudywing)
Thorybes drusius (Drusius cloudywing)
Thorybes pylades (northern cloudywing)
Timochares ruptifasciatus (brown-banded skipper)
Typhedanus undulatus (mottled longtail)
Urbanus belli (double-striped longtail)
Urbanus dorantes (Dorantes longtail)
Urbanus doryssus (white-tailed longtail)
Urbanus esmeraldus (Esmeralda longtail)
Urbanus procne (brown longtail)
Urbanus pronus (pronus longtail)
Urbanus proteus (long-tailed skipper)
Urbanus simplicius (plain longtail)
Urbanus tanna (Tanna longtail)
Urbanus teleus (Teleus longtail)
Xenophanes tryxus (glassy-winged skipper)
Zestusa dorus (short-tailed skipper)

Subfamily Hesperiinae (grass skippers)
Adopaeoides prittwitzi (sunrise skipper)
Amblyscirtes aenus (bronze roadside-skipper)
Amblyscirtes aesculapius (lace-winged roadside-skipper)
Amblyscirtes alternata (dusky roadside-skipper)
Amblyscirtes belli (Bell's roadside-skipper)
Amblyscirtes cassus (cassus roadside-skipper)
Amblyscirtes celia (Celia's roadside skipper)
Amblyscirtes eos (dotted roadside-skipper)
Amblyscirtes hegon (pepper and salt skipper)
Amblyscirtes nereus (slaty roadside-skipper)
Amblyscirtes nysa (Nysa roadside-skipper)
Amblyscirtes oslari (Oslar's roadside-skipper)
Amblyscirtes phylace (orange-headed roadside-skipper)
Amblyscirtes simius (simius roadside-skipper)
Amblyscirtes texanae (Texas roadside-skipper)
Amblyscirtes vialis (common roadside-skipper)
Anatrytone logan (Delaware skipper)
Anatrytone mazai (glowing skipper)
Ancyloxypha arene (tropical least skipper)
Ancyloxypha numitor (least skipper)
Atalopedes campestris (sachem)
Atrytone arogos (arogos skipper)
Atrytonopsis edwardsii (sheep skipper)
Atrytonopsis hianna (dusted skipper)
Atrytonopsis pittacus (white-barred skipper)
Atrytonopsis python (python skipper)
Atrytonopsis vierecki (Viereck's skipper)
Calpodes ethlius (Brazilian skipper)
Conga chydaea (hidden-ray skipper)
Copaeodes aurantiacia (orange skipperling)
Copaeodes minima (southern skipperling)
Corticea corticea (redundant skipper)
Cymaenes odilia trebius ('Trebius' fawn-spotted skipper)
Decinea percosius (double-dotted skipper)
Euphyes bayensis (bay skipper)
Euphyes dion (Dion skipper)
Euphyes dukesi (Dukes' skipper)
Euphyes vestris (dun skipper)
Hesperia attalus (dotted skipper)
Hesperia juba (Juba skipper)
Hesperia meskei (Meske's skipper)
Hesperia metea (cobweb skipper)
Hesperia ottoe (ottoe skipper)
Hesperia pahaska (Pahaska skipper)
Hesperia uncas (Uncas skipper)
Hesperia viridis (green skipper)
Hesperia woodgatei (Apache skipper)
Hylephila phyleus (fiery skipper)
Lerema accius (clouded skipper)
Lerema ancillaris (Liris skipper)
Lerodea arabus (olive-clouded skipper)
Lerodea eufala (Eufala skipper)
Monca telata tyrtaeus ('Tyrtaeus' violet-patched skipper)
Nastra julia (Julia's skipper)
Nastra lherminier (swarthy skipper)
Nastra neamathla (Neamathla skipper)
Nyctelius nyctelius (violet-banded skipper)
Oarisma edwardsii (Edwards' skipperling)
Oligoria maculata (twin-spot skipper)
Panoquina evansi (Evans' skipper)
Panoquina hecebola (Hecebolus skipper)
Panoquina leucas (purple-washed skipper)
Panoquina ocola (ocola skipper)
Panoquina panoquin (salt marsh skipper)
Panoquina panoquinoides (obscure skipper)
Perichares philetes (green-backed ruby-eye)
Piruna hafernicki (Chisos skipperling)
Piruna microstictus (small-spotted skipperling)
Piruna pirus (russet skipperling)
Piruna polingi (four-spotted skipperling)
Poanes aaroni (Aaron's skipper)
Poanes melane (umber skipper)
Poanes taxiles (Taxiles skipper)
Poanes viator (broad-winged skipper)
Poanes yehl (Yehl skipper)
Poanes zabulon (Zabulon skipper)
Polites carus (Carus skipper)
Polites origenes (crossline skipper)
Polites peckius (Peck's skipper)
Polites rhesus (rhesus skipper)
Polites themistocles (tawny-edged skipper)
Polites vibex (whirlabout)
Pompeius verna (little glassywing)
Problema byssus (byssus skipper)
Quasimellana eulogius (common mellana)
Quasimellana mexicana
Rhinthon cubana osca (osca skipper)
Stinga morrisoni (Morrison's skipper)
Synapte malitiosa (malicious skipper)
Synapte salenus (salenus skipper)
Thespieus macareus (chestnut-marked skipper)
Vettius fantasos (fantastic skipper)
Vidius perigenes (pale-rayed skipper)
Wallengrenia egeremet (northern broken-dash)
Wallengrenia otho (southern broken-dash)

Subfamily Megathyminae (giant-skippers)
Agathymus mariae (Mary's giant-skipper)
Agathymus neumoegeni (orange giant-skipper)
Agathymus remingtoni (Coahuila giant-skipper)
Megathymus streckeri (Strecker's giant-skipper)
Megathymus ursus (ursine giant-skipper)
Megathymus yuccae (yucca giant-skipper)
Stallingsia maculosa (manfreda giant-skipper)

References

Butterflies
Texas
Texas